Whatatutu is a small settlement in the northeast of New Zealand's North Island. It is located north of Te Karaka on the upper reaches of the Waipaoa River, close to its meeting with its tributaries, the Mangatu River and Waingaromia River.

Whatatutu is about 45 minutes from Gisborne and is home to about 300 people. Oil-bearing rock has been known to exist in small quantities for many years, but not in commercial quantities. The search for more economically viable sources continues in the area.

Marae

Whatatutu has three marae related to the hapū of Te Aitanga ā Māhaki, originally belonging to the Iwi of Ngariki Kaiputahi.

Māngatu Marae and Te Ngāwari meeting house is a meeting place of Ngariki Kaiputahi. In October 2020, the Government committed $185,301 from the Provincial Growth Fund to upgrade the marae's effluent system, creating 3 jobs.

Te Wainui and Te Whare o Hera meeting house is also affiliated with the Ngariki Kaiputahi Iwi. In October 2020, the Government committed $812,548 to upgrade Mahaki marae and Mātāwai Marae, creating 15.4 jobs.

Taihamiti Marae is a meeting place of Ngāi Tamatea.

References

Populated places in the Gisborne District